Carole Péon (born 4 November 1978) is a French triathlete. She competed at the 2008 and 2012 Summer Olympics. She is openly lesbian and in 2005 began a relationship with fellow French triathlete Jessica Harrison.

References

External links
 

1978 births
Living people
French female triathletes
French LGBT sportspeople
Olympic triathletes of France
Triathletes at the 2008 Summer Olympics
Triathletes at the 2012 Summer Olympics
Sportspeople from Nice
Lesbian sportswomen
LGBT triathletes
21st-century LGBT people
20th-century French women
21st-century French women